
The following lists events that happened during 1804 in South Africa.

Events
 25 April – The settlement of Uitenhage is established

Births
 29 May – Gottlieb Wilhelm Antonie van der Lingen, founder of the Paarl Gymnasium, is born in Cape Town

References
See Years in South Africa for list of References

History of South Africa